Cyril Hatton (14 September 1918 – 3 July 1987) was a footballer with QPR.

He signed in 1946 from Notts County and made his debut in a 2–1 win against Watford in August 1946. He played inside-left and went on to play 162 league games for Rangers scoring 64 league goals. He was a key part of the 1948 team that won the Third Division (South) Championship.

Cyril transferred to Chesterfield in 1953.

References

Queens Park Rangers F.C. players
Notts County F.C. players
Chesterfield F.C. players
People from Grantham
1918 births
1987 deaths
Association football inside forwards
English footballers